Carlos Alberto Lugo Gamboa (born 6 February 1993) is a Mexican footballer who plays as a defender.

Career

C.D. Guadalajara
Lugo spent his whole youth career at C.D. Guadalajara's youth academy.

Loan at Coras
In July 2014, it was announced Lugo was sent out on loan to Ascenso MX club Coras de Tepic in order to gain professional playing experience. He made his professional debut on 13 September 2014 against Atlético San Luis.

References

External links
 
 

1993 births
Living people
Footballers from Sinaloa
Mexican footballers
Association football defenders
La Piedad footballers
Coras de Nayarit F.C. footballers